Media Mouse was a Grand Rapids, Michigan independent media group founded in 1999. In 2004 the group's primary focus shifted to providing regular news coverage of "progressive" movements for social change in Grand Rapids  that were posted online via its website, www.mediamouse.org. Media Mouse ceased production in 2009. It described its goals in its mission statement:

"Media Mouse is an independent media collective that works to provide independent news pertaining to Grand Rapids and the world. Wherever possible, Media Mouse aims to draw links between national and local issues and between movements for social change. In turn, it is hoped that this news will be a catalyst for action and will help spur organizing for social change."

In 2007, Media Mouse began hosting and collaborating with the Grand Rapids Institute for Information Democracy (GRIID) which was previously a part of the Grand Rapids Community Media Center.

Resources

In addition its news coverage, Media Mouse offers a variety of resources including databases and special subject areas:
 "The Far Right in West Michigan" Database
 Progressive Directory of Western Michigan
 Grand Rapids Military Contracts Database
 Calendar of Social Change Oriented Events in West Michigan

The Bloom Collective 

In June 2007, Media Mouse became involved in The Bloom Collective, an infoshop located at 8 Jefferson SE in Grand Rapids, Michigan.

In addition to lending books and videos, the Bloom Collective also serves as a meeting place for mediated community discussions on various radical topics and strategies for change.

References

External links
Media Mouse web site

Mass media in Grand Rapids, Michigan
Communications and media organizations based in the United States